These are the late night schedules for the four United States broadcast networks that offer programming during this time period, from September 1992 to August 1993. All times are Eastern or Pacific. Affiliates will fill non-network schedule with local, syndicated, or paid programming. Affiliates also have the option to preempt or delay network programming at their discretion.

Legend

Schedule

Monday-Friday

Saturday

By network

ABC

Returning series:
ABC in Concert
ABC World News Now
Nightline

Not returning from 1991-92:
Studio 59

CBS

Returning series:
A Closer Score
CBS Late Night
Crimetime After Primetime
Kids in the Hall 
Personals
Up To The Minute

Not returning from 1991-92:
CBS News Nightwatch
Night Games

NBC

Returning series:
Friday Night Videos
Late Night with David Letterman
Later
NBC Nightside
Saturday Night Live
The Tonight Show with Jay Leno

Not returning from 1991-92:
The Tonight Show Starring Johnny Carson

Fox

Returning series:
Comic Strip Live

United States late night network television schedules
1992 in American television
1993 in American television